General Tan Sri Ackbal bin Abdul Samad is a Former Malaysian General who served as Chief of Royal Malaysian Air Force.

Honours

 Member of the Order of the Defender of the Realm (A.M.N.) (1997)
 Companion of the Order of Loyalty to the Crown of Malaysia (J.S.M.) (2009)
 Commander of the Order of Meritorious Service (P.J.N.) - Datuk (2013)
 Commander of the Order of Loyalty to the Crown of Malaysia (P.S.M.) - Tan Sri (2020)
 Malaysian Armed Forces
 Officer of The Most Gallant Order of Military Service (K.A.T.)
 Warrior of The Most Gallant Order of Military Service (P.A.T.)
 Loyal Commander of The Most Gallant Order of Military Service (P.S.A.T.)
 :
 Companion of the Order of the Crown of Pahang (S.M.P.) (2003)
 Companion of the Order of Sultan Ahmad Shah of Pahang (S.A.P.) (2005)
 Knight Companion of the Order of the Crown of Pahang (D.I.M.P.) - Dato’ (2006)
 Knight Companion of the Order of Sultan Ahmad Shah of Pahang (D.S.A.P.) - Dato' (2009)
 Grand Knight of the Order of the Crown of Pahang (S.I.M.P.) - Dato’ Indera (2010)
 Grand Knight of the Order of Sultan Ahmad Shah of Pahang (S.S.A.P.) - Dato’ Sri (2011)

 Knight Commander of the Order of the Defender of State (D.P.P.N.) - Dato’ Seri (2020)

References 

Members of the Order of the Defender of the Realm
Companions of the Order of Loyalty to the Crown of Malaysia
Commanders of the Order of Meritorious Service
Commanders of the Order of Loyalty to the Crown of Malaysia
People from Johor
Royal Malaysian Air Force personnel
Living people
Year of birth missing (living people)